Varsity Arena, located at 299 Bloor Street West, Toronto, Ontario is an indoor arena that opened on December 17, 1926, and is primarily home to the ice hockey teams of the University of Toronto, the Varsity Blues. It also hosted the Toronto Toros of the WHA from 1973 to 1974 and the Toronto Planets of the RHI in 1993. It is located beside Varsity Stadium.

One of the first indoor arenas to be built without pillars in the seating area blocking the line of sight, Varsity Arena sat close to 4,800 in double wooden chairs at the time of its construction. It was designed by Professor T. R. Loudon along with architects Messers. Originally the floor under the ice surface consisted of iron pipes covered in sand.

The seating capacity was reduced to 4,116 by renovations in 1985–86, which expanded the ice sheet to professional standards and eliminated fire code violations that had been found in 1977.

It is also the home of the University of Toronto Intramural hockey league, which comprises (as of the Winter term of 2006) of 46 men's and eight women's teams of varying skill levels (from recreational to near-varsity calibre) competing in six men's and two women's divisions. 

Prior to 2009, the university also used the arena to host examinations. 

The first goal in the arena was scored by future NHL player Dave Trottier of the Varsity Grads in a two-period exhibition game against the Varsity Blues on opening night.

References

External links
Varsity Arena history from http://hockey.ballparks.com

Ice hockey venues in Toronto
Indoor arenas in Ontario
Indoor ice hockey venues in Canada
University of Toronto buildings
World Hockey Association venues
Darling and Pearson buildings
University sports venues in Canada
Continental Basketball Association venues
1926 establishments in Ontario
Sports venues completed in 1926